Patrick Johannes Adams (born August 27, 1981) is a Canadian actor. He is known for playing Mike Ross, a college dropout turned unlicensed lawyer in USA Network's series Suits. For his role in Suits, Adams was nominated for Outstanding Performance by a Male Actor in a Drama Series at the 18th Screen Actors Guild Awards.

Early life and education 
Adams was born in Toronto, Ontario, Canada. His mother is Rowan Marsh. His father is journalist Claude Adams. He attended Northern Secondary School.

Following his parents' divorce, Adams moved from Toronto to Los Angeles at age 19, where he attended the University of Southern California, earning a BFA. After earning the Jack Nicholson Award in 2004, which provided scholarships directly funded by the eponymous actor to outstanding performers at the school and earning his BFA, he immediately began working on a production of Edward Albee's The Goat, or Who is Sylvia? at the Mark Taper Forum.

Acting career

Television 
Adams appeared in episodes of Cold Case, Pretty Little Liars, Jack & Bobby, and has since had roles in Lost, Friday Night Lights, Without a Trace, Commander in Chief, Heartland, Ghost Whisperer, NCIS, Cupid, Luck, Raising the Bar, Legends of Tomorrow, Lie to Me and Suits. He starred as twin brothers in the 2008 ABC pilot Good Behavior, executive produced by Rob Thomas. In 2009, he signed for the male lead in the one-hour drama The Dealership, starring opposite Tricia Helfer and William Devane. His television appearances grew over the next few years, from guest appearances on Numb3rs to a recurring role as a love interest for Adrianne Palicki on Friday Night Lights and leads in TV features like the romantic comedy Christmas in Boston.

In 2007, he moved up to guest appearances on top-rated shows like Lost, where he played a young man who sought out John Locke (played by Terry O'Quinn), while maintaining his presence in the Los Angeles theater scene, most notably with an award-winning production of "Marat/Sade," which he produced and directed for the Blue House Theatre Company. In 2010, Adams guest starred in Pretty Little Liars, in the 5th episode; "Reality Bites Me" as Ezra Fitz's college friend, Hardy.

In mid-2011, he began starring in the co-lead role of Mike Ross in Suits on the basic-cable USA Network, after being fired from the pilot of NBC's Friends With Benefits. He garnered much acclaim for his role in the series, which continued through its seventh season in 2017–18. Beginning in Season 3, Adams was listed as a co-producer of Suits (with co-star Gabriel Macht) and directed some episodes. On January 30, 2018, it was announced Adams was departing from the show following the completion of its seventh season. He appeared in HBO's 2012 TV series Luck as recurring character Nathan Israel.

In 2016, Adams was cast as Hourman in the TV series Legends of Tomorrow. Playing the Rex Tyler iteration, he appeared at the end of the season 1 finale before being killed off in the season 2 premiere.

In 2020, he was cast in the role of legendary astronaut John Glenn for the Disney+ series The Right Stuff.

Film 
Adams's work in film includes supporting roles in Old School and Two: Thirteen, and lead roles in Weather Girl (a 2009 Slamdance entry) and the 2009 Berlin International Film Festival competitor Rage, directed by Sally Potter. In the beginning of 2018 he released his first own shortfilm, We Are Here. He wrote, directed and acted the short film together with his wife Troian Bellisario.

Theatre 
Adams made his Broadway debut in the Second Stage Theater revival of Take Me Out that was originally slated to open at the Hayes Theater in April 2020; however, due to the COVID-19 pandemic, the show was postponed for two years and previews finally began on March 10, 2022, with the show officially opening on April 4, 2022. For his role in the play as Christopher "Kippy" Sunderstrom, Adams received a nomination from the Outer Critics Circle Awards for Outstanding Actor in a Play.
Patrick displays full frontal nudity in this role.

Personal life 

Adams has been married to Pretty Little Liars star Troian Bellisario since December 2016. The two met in 2009 when they were cast opposite each other in the play Equivocation. Prior to his appearance on Pretty Little Liars, Adams and Bellisario had broken up; but they got back together after Adams' guest appearance on Pretty Little Liars in 2010. Adams and Bellisario  married on December 10, 2016, in Santa Barbara, California. In October 2018, Adams announced the birth of the couple's firstborn, a daughter. The couple's second daughter was born in May 2021.

In an episode of the podcast Katie's Crib hosted by actress Katie Lowes, Adams and Bellisario said their second child was born in their car in the hospital's parking lot due to accelerated labour, the hospital staff quickly assisting within minutes of the delivery.

Adams and Bellisario attended his Suits co-star Meghan Markle's wedding to Prince Harry at St George's Chapel, Windsor Castle on May 19, 2018.

He was awarded Honorary Life Membership of University College Dublin Law Society in September 2013. He plays the guitar and is an avid photographer who owns over 25 cameras.
His photos were featured in Suits Behind the Lens and #PJAGallery events.

Filmography

Film

Television

References

External links 
 
 Patrick Adams
 

Canadian male television actors
Canadian male film actors
Canadian male stage actors
Canadian expatriate male actors in the United States
Canadian people of German descent
Living people
1981 births
USC School of Dramatic Arts alumni
Male actors from Toronto
21st-century Canadian male actors
Bellisario family